Zalava (Persian: زالاوا‎) is a 2021 Iranian horror drama film directed by Arsalan Amiri and written by Amiri, Ida Panahandeh and Tahmineh Bahramalian. The film screened for the first time at the 39th Fajr Film Festival and earned 6 nominations and received 4 awards.

Cast 
 Navid Pourfaraj as Sergeant Masoud Ahmadi
 Pouria Rahimi Sam as Amardan
 Hoda Zeinolabedin as Malihe
 Baset Rezaei as Younes
 Fereydoun Hamedi as Amous
 Shahou Rostami as Khalaj
 Mahsa Hejazi as Khalaj's daughter
 Leila Beigi as Leila
 Zahed Zandi as Sergeant Amini
 Saleh Rahimi as Arhim
 Hadi Ahmadi as Soldier
 Darioush Karim Raouf as Zalava People
 Salar Zarei as Zalava People
 Masoud Beigi as Zalava People
 Kordowan Boustan as Musician
 Varya Amini as Zalava People
 Asad Houshman as Zalava People
 Azin Kananian as Zalava People
 Romina Haji Hosseini as Zalava People
 Narin Malek as Zalava People
 Keyvan Sheikh Ahmadi as Zalava People

Reception

Critical response 

On Rotten Tomatoes, the film holds an approval rating of 89% based on 17 reviews, with an average rating of 7.2/10.

— Variety / Alissa Simon

— Haft / Massoud Farasati

Accolades

References

External links 

 

Kurdish-language films
Iranian horror films
2020s Persian-language films
2021 films
2021 horror films
2021 multilingual films
Iranian multilingual films